Dichlorophen is an anticestodal agent, fungicide, germicide, and antimicrobial agent. It is used in combination with toluene for the removal of parasites such as ascarids, hookworms, and tapeworms from dogs and cats.

Safety and regulation
LD50 (oral, mouse) is 3300 mg/kg.

References

Antiparasitic agents
Chloroarenes
Phenols
Veterinary drugs